Hyalomis is a genus of moths in the subfamily Arctiinae. The genus was first described by George Hampson in 1905.

Species
 Hyalomis espia Dognin, 1897
 Hyalomis hypochryseis Hampson, 1898
 Hyalomis platyleuca Walker, 1854
 Hyalomis thyria Druce, 1898

Former species
 Hyalomis basilutea Walker, 1854, now Hyda basilutea (Walker, 1854)

References

External links

Euchromiina
Moth genera